Chorrak or Chork may refer to:
 Chorrak, Qasr-e Qand
 Chorrak, Zabol